Lisa Darr (born April 21, 1963) is an American actress.

Life and career
Darr was born Lisa Darr Grabemann in Chicago, Illinois, the daughter of Mollie, an actress, and Karl Grabemann, a lawyer. She attended Stanford University and graduated in 1985 with a degree in biology. She went on to receive an MFA in Acting from UCLA.

She played Annie Whitman on ABC's Life as We Know It. Darr's previous television appearances include the 1991 short-lived sitcom Flesh 'n' Blood as Rachel Brennan, The WB's teenage drama Popular as Jane McPherson, as well as the short-lived but critically acclaimed 1996 Fox series Profit as Gail Koner. In the fifth season of the sitcom Ellen, she played Laurie Manning, the girlfriend of the title character Ellen Morgan; In "Four for the Seasaw", an episode of Frasier, she and Megan Mullally played love interests for the Crane brothers. She played archaeologist Ginny Will on an episode of Quantum Leap.

Darr also made an appearance on the Fox drama House in 2006, playing a victim's mother in the episode "Distractions". She has made an appearance on the third season of The Office in the episode "Product Recall". Darr appeared in the fourth season of Weeds (on Showtime) as Ann Carilli. She also made a guest appearance in Nip/Tuck.

Her film work includes the Oscar-award-winning Gods and Monsters (1998), in which she appeared as Dana Boone (the wife of Brendan Fraser's character), Pomegranate (2005), as Julia (the mother of Leah Pipes's character) in the soccer film Her Best Move (2006), National Lampoon's Bag Boy (2007), and This Is 40 (2012).

Filmography

Film

Television

References

External links

The Unofficial Lisa Darr Cyber-site

1963 births
Actresses from Chicago
American film actresses
American television actresses
Living people
New Trier High School alumni
Stanford University alumni
UCLA Film School alumni
20th-century American actresses
21st-century American actresses